The Tagalog language has developed a unique vocabulary since its inception from its direct Austronesian roots, incorporating words from Malay, Hokkien, Spanish, Nahuatl, English, Sanskrit, Tamil, Japanese, Arabic, Persian, and Quechua.

Spanish 

The Filipino language incorporated Spanish loanwords as a result of 333 years of contact with the Spanish language. In their analysis of José Villa Panganiban's Talahuluganang Pilipino-Ingles (Pilipino-English dictionary), Llamzon and Thorpe (1972) pointed out that 33% of word root entries are of Spanish origin. As the aforementioned analysis didn't reveal the frequency of the usage of these words by native speakers, a study was conducted by Antonio Quilis in order to understand the percentage of Spanish-derived words used by Filipinos in their daily conversations. Through his studies, the results of which were published in 1973 in the case of Tagalog and in 1976 in the case of Cebuano, it was found out that 20.4% of the lexicon used by Tagalog speakers were of Spanish origin, while it was 20.5% in the case of Cebuano. According to Patrick O. Steinkrüger, depending on the text type, around 20% of the vocabulary in a Tagalog text are of Spanish origin. In an analysis of a Tagalog-language corpus consisting of randow news, fiction and non-fiction articles published between 2005 and 2015, Ekaterina Baklanova found out that Spanish-derived words constitute 20% of the lexicon used. An example is the sentence below in which Spanish–derived words are in italics (original in parentheses):

Tagalog: "Puwede (Puede) ba akóng umupô sa silya (silla) sa tabi ng bintana (ventana) hábang nása biyahe (viaje) táyo sa eroplano (aeroplano)?"
Translation in English: ("May I sit on the chair near the window during our voyage in the aeroplane?")

The adoption of the Abakada alphabet in 1940 changed the spelling of the Spanish loanwords present in the Filipino language. The spellings of Spanish loanwords were reformed according to the new orthographic rules. Examples include:

agila (from Sp. águila), alkalde (from Sp. alcalde), bakuna (from Sp. vacuna), banyo (from Sp. baño), baso (from Sp. vaso), biktima (from Sp. víctima), bintana (from Sp. ventana), bisita (from Sp. visita), biyahe (from Sp. viaje), braso (from Sp. brazo), demokrasya (from Sp. democracia), diyaryo (from Sp. diario), estudyante (from Sp. estudiante),  heneral (from Sp. general), hustisya (from Sp. justicia), kama (from Sp. cama), kambiyo (from Sp. cambio de marcha), keso (from Sp. queso), kutsara (from Sp. cuchara), kuwarto (from Sp. cuarto), kuwento (from Sp. cuento), lababo (from Sp. lavabo), mensahe (from Sp. mensaje), meryenda (from Sp. merienda), mikrobyo (from Sp. microbio), niyebe (from Sp. nieve), panyo (from Sp. paño), pila (from Sp. fila), plema (from Sp. flema), presyo (from Sp. precio), prinsesa (from Sp. princesa), reseta (from Sp. receta médica), reyna (from Sp. reina), serbisyo (from Sp. servicio), sinturon (from Sp. cinturón), teklado (from Sp. teclado), telebisyon (from Sp. televisión), tinidor (from Sp. tenedor), trabaho (from Sp. trabajo), tuwalya (from Sp. toalla) and yelo (from Sp. hielo).

Other loanwords underwent phonological changes. Vowel changes can be observed to some of the Spanish words upon adoption into the Filipino language, such as an /i/ to /a/ vowel shift observed in the Filipino word paminta, which came from the Spanish word pimienta, and a pre-nasal /e/ to /u/ vowel shift observed in several words such as unano (from Sp. enano) and umpisa (from Sp. empezar). Prothetic /a/ is added in the loanwords alisto (from Sp. listo) and aplaya (from Sp. playa). Other words underwent vowel deletion, e.g., pusta (from Sp. apostar), tarantado (from Sp. atarantado), kursonada (from Sp. corazonada), Pasko (from Sp. Pascua) and labi (from Sp. labio).

Consonant shifts can also be observed to some of the Spanish words upon their adoption into the Filipino language. The [r] to [l] consonant shift can be observed in the following words:

albularyo (folk healer, from Sp. herbolario), alma (from Sp. armar), almusal (from Sp. almorzar), asukal (from Sp. azúcar), balbas (from Sp. barba), bandila (from. Sp. bandera), dasal (from Sp. rezar), hibla (thread or strand, from Sp. hebra), hilo (dizzy, from Sp. giro), hulmá (to mould, from Sp. ahormar), kasal (from Sp. casar), kumpisal (from Sp. confesar), lagadera (from Sp. regadera), litratista (photographer, from Sp. retratista), litrato (photograph, portrait or picture; from Sp. retrato), multo (from Sp. muerto), nunal (from Sp. lunar), pastol (from Sp. pastor) and pasyal (from Sp. pasear).

The loss of the /l/ phoneme can be observed in the Filipino word kutson derived from the Spanish colchón. The loss of the /t/ phoneme can be observed in the Filipino words talino (intelligence or wisdom, from Sp. talento) and tina (dye, from Sp. tinta). Some Spanish-derived words have also undergone consonant or syllable deletion upon introduction to Tagalog like in the case of limos (from Sp. limosna), masyado (from Sp. demasiado), posas (from Sp. esposas), restawran (from Sp. restaurante), riles (rail, railway or railroad; from Sp. carriles), sindi (from Sp. encender) and sintunado (from Sp. desentonado).

The Spanish digraph [ll] is pronounced by the Spaniards as /j/ during the Renaissance era and this reflected on the pronunciation and the spelling of Spanish-derived loanwords in Tagalog introduced before the 19th century, where the digraph [ll] becomes [y] in Tagalog. Such is the case of the words barya (from Sp. barrilla), kabayo (from Sp. caballo), kutamaya (from. Sp. cota de malla), lauya (a stew of meat and vegetables, from Sp. la olla), sibuyas (from Sp. cebollas) and tabliya or tablea (from Sp. tablilla de chocolate). Spanish loanwords in which the digraph [ll] is pronounced as /lj/ in Tagalog might have been introduced (or reintroduced) during the 19th century. Examples include apelyido (from Sp. apellido), balyena (from Sp. ballena), kalye (from Sp. calle), kutsilyo (from Sp. cuchillo), makinilya (from Sp. maquinilla de escribir), sepilyo (from Sp. cepillo de dientes), silya (from Sp. silla) and sigarilyo (from Sp. cigarrillo). There are also rare cases of Tagalog doublets coming from the same Spanish etymological root which exhibit both the influences of the Renaissance /j/ and the latter /λ/ sounds, like in the case of the Tagalog word pair laryo and ladrilyo, both from Sp. ladrillo. There are also instances of the Spanish digraph [ll] being transformed into [l] upon adoption by Tagalog. Such is the case of the following words: kulani (lymph node, from Sp. collarín), kursilista (from Sp. cursillista) and úling (coal, soot or charcoal; from Sp. hollín.

Vestigial influences of Middle Spanish voiceless palato-alveolar fricative /ʃ/ are evident in some of the Spanish-derived loanwords in Tagalog, where the /ʃ/ sound is transformed into the Tagalog /s/. Examples include relos (clock or wristwatch, from Sp. reloj, pronounced as /reˈloʃ/ in Middle Spanish), sabon (soap, from Sp. jabón, pronounced as /ʃaˈbon/ in Middle Spanish), saro (pitcher or jug, from Sp. jarro, pronounced as /ˈʃaro/ in Middle Spanish), sugal (to gamble, from Sp. jugar, pronounced as /ʃuˈgar/ in Middle Spanish) and tasa (to sharpen, from Sp. tajar, pronounced as /taˈʃar/ in Middle Spanish). Loanwords which have the pronunciation that reflects the transition from Middle Spanish /ʃ/ to Modern Spanish /x/ are also present in Tagalog. The Modern Spanish /x/ sound is rendered in Tagalog as [h], which is the standard pronunciation in other Spanish dialects. Example cases include ahedres (from Sp. ajedrez), anghel (from Sp. ángel), halaya (from Sp. jalea), hardin (from Sp. jardín), hepe (police chief, from Sp. jefe), kahera and kahero (cashier, from Sp. cajera and cajero respectively) and kahon (from Sp. cajón). There are also rare cases of doublets that exhibit influences of both the Middle Spanish /ʃ/ and Modern Spanish /x/ like for example in the cases of Tagalog muson and mohon (both from Sp. mojón) and relos and relo (both from Sp. reloj).

The compound word batya't palo–palo, a phrase in the laundry business where many Spanish words proliferate. The words were taken from the Spanish batea for "washing tub" and palo for "stick", something a typical Filipino might think had no Spanish provenance at all because of the Tagalog verb palo which means "strike".

Some loanwords have been associated to new meanings, such as kursonada (corazonada, originally meaning '"hunch"), which means "object of desire"; sospetsoso (sospechoso) is the "suspicious person" and not the "suspect" as in the original; insekto ("insecto"), which still means "insect" but also refers to a "pesty clownish person"; or even sige (sigue), a Spanish word for "continue" or "follow", which is popularly understood to mean "all right" or "go ahead".

Some Spanish affixes are combined with Tagalog words to make new words. For example, pakialamero (from Tag. pakialam, "to meddle" and the Sp. suffix –ero, masculine subject); majongero ("mahjong", ultimately from Chinese, and the Sp. suffix –ero); basketbolista, boksingero. Daisysiete is a word play and portmanteau of the English "daisy" and the Spanish diecisiete ("seventeen"), now meaning a sweet and sexually desirable underaged (17 year-old) female. Bastusing katawán (Sp.: basto -> bastos & Tag.: katawan) is an example of a two-word term for a bombshell body.

Tagalog still uses Spanish language influence in coining new words, e.g., alaskadór ("Alaska" + Sp. suffix '–ador'); bérde ("verde"="green", nuanced to "toilet humour" or "blue joke", a literal Tagalog translation of Philippine English term "green(-minded)".); which are not readily understood in Spain or any Latin American country.

Spanish influences on Tagalog morphosyntax 

Although the overall influence of Spanish on the morphosyntax of the Tagalog language was minimal, there are fully functional Spanish-derived words that have produced syntactic innovations on Tagalog. Clear influences of Spanish can be seen in the morphosyntax of comparison and the existence of Spanish-derived modals and conjunctions, as will be discussed in more detail below.

Kumusta as an interrogative word in Tagalog 

All of the interrogative words used in Tagalog are not related to Spanish, with the exception of kumusta. The word kumusta is derived from the Spanish ¿cómo está? and it functions as a Tagalog interrogative word used as a substitute for an adjective of quality or condition equivalent to the English how. Kumusta can also be used as a greeting (similar to English "Hello!") or as a verb with the meaning of "to greet" or "to say hello". The native term can be used as Ohoy and Taupo, however these were lost in translations.

Spanish-derived comparative markers 

Tagalog has several comparative markers that are etymologically derived from Spanish. The particle mas (meaning "more", from Sp. más), in conjunction with the various Tagalog counterparts of the English "than" (kaysa + sa-marker, sa, kay), is used as a comparative marker of non-equality. Another comparative marker of non-equality is kumpara (from Sp. comparado), usually followed with the appropriate sa-marker and used as the Tagalog equivalent of the English "compared to". Lastly, the word pareho (from Sp. parejo), commonly employed with the Tagalog linker -ng, is used as a comparative marker of equality.

Spanish-derived Tagalog modals 

There are several Spanish-derived words that have acquired function as modals upon adoption in Tagalog. Tagalog modals, including those that are etymologically derived from Spanish, can be classified into two main groups: words realizing deontic modality (i.e. modals concerned with expressing inclination, obligation and ability) and words realizing epistemic modality (i.e. modals concerned with degrees of reality).

Deontic modality in Tagalog is realized through words which are grammaticized by Paul Schachter and Fe T. Otanes as "pseudo-verbs". An example of a Spanish-derived Tagalog deontic modal is gusto (from Sp. gusto), which is used to denote preference or desire. Gusto is considered to be more commonly used than its other counterparts newly adapted to this usage such as nais or ibig, since these two words are usually perceived as more formal than gusto and are more commonly used in literature than in colloquial speech. Another example is puwede (from Sp. puede), which can be translated in English as "can" and is thus used to express permission or ability. The word puwede co-exists with its equivalent maaárì and the two pseudo-verbs are deemed to have little semantic difference, with puwede only being considered usually as more colloquial and less formal than maaari.

Epistemic modality in Tagalog is realized through words functioning as adverbials. These words, when used as modals, are typically linked to the clause that they modalize through the Tagalog linker -ng or na. An example of a Spanish-derived epistemic modal used for expressing high degree of probability is sigurado + -ng (from Sp. seguro + -ado), with the meaning of "surely" or "certainly", and is considered as a synonym of Tagalog tiyak, sigurado is derived from "asegurado", "assured". The word siguro (from Sp. seguro) is an epistemic modal marking moderate degree of probability, with the meaning of "maybe", "probably" or "perhaps". The word siguro is also identified by the linguist Ekaterina Baklanova as a Spanish-derived discourse marker in Tagalog, thus contrasting the claims of other scholars such as Patrick Steinkrüger  that none of the numerous discourse markers in Tagalog are of Spanish origin. Similarly to Tagalog, the word siguro is also considered as an adverbial clitic in Cebuano and in Masbateño. Posible + -ng (from Sp. posible), which can be translated to English as "possibly", is a Tagalog epistemic modal marking low degree of probability. Examples of Spanish-derived Tagalog epistemic modals marking excessive degree of intensity include masyado + -ng (from Sp. demasiado) and sobra + -ng (from Sp. sobra) while medyo (from Sp. medio) marks moderate degree of intensity.

Spanish-derived Tagalog conjunctions 

Several conjunctions in Tagalog have Spanish-derived etymological roots. The Tagalog disjunctive conjunction o (from Sp. o, meaning "or") has completely substituted the old Tagalog equivalent "kun", rendering the latter obsolete. Two Spanish-derived counter-expectational adversative conjunctions used in Tagalog are pero (from Sp. pero) and kaso (from Sp. caso), both of which are considered as synonyms of the Tagalog counterparts ngunit, subalit, etc. The Tagalog ni (from Sp. ni) can be used as a negative repetitive conjunction, similar to the English "neither...nor" construction. When not repeated, ni assumes a scalar focus value stripped of all its conjunction function, translatable to English as "not even". Basta (from Sp. basta), when used as a conditional conjunction, assumes a meaning similar to English "as long as" or "provided that". Maski (from Sp. mas que) is a synonym of Tagalog kahit and both are used as Tagalog concessive conjunctions. Porke (from Sp. porque) assumes the function of causal conjunction in Tagalog and it is used to express an ironic or critical attitude, translatable to English as "just because" or "only because". The Tagalog puwera kung (from Sp. fuera) is used as a negative exceptive conditional conjunction, translatable in English as "unless" or "except if", used alongside "maliban sa" or "liban sa". The Tagalog oras na (from Sp. hora) is a temporal conjunction which can be translated in English as "the moment that". The Tagalog imbes na (from Sp. en vez) is used as an implicit adversative conjunction and it can be translated in English as "instead of". The Tagalog para (from Sp. para), when used to introduce verb-less or basic-form predicates, assumes the role of a purposive conjunction. However, if followed by the appropriate dative sa-marker, para assumes the role of a benefactive marker in Tagalog.

Loanwords that underwent semantic shift 

Upon adoption into Tagalog, a number of Spanish-derived terms underwent a process of semantic shift or change in meaning. A loanword is said to have undergone a semantic shift if its meaning in Tagalog deviates from the original meaning of the word in the source language (in this case, Spanish). A type of semantic shift is the so-called semantic narrowing, which is a linguistic phenomenon in which the meaning of a Spanish-derived word acquires a less general or inclusive meaning upon adoption into Tagalog. Semantic narrowing occurs when a word undergoes specialization of usage. For example, the word kuryente (meaning "electricity" or "electric current") comes from the Spanish word corriente, which is a general term to refer to any current, whether electric or not. Upon adoption of the word corriente into Tagalog as kuryente, it underwent a semantic narrowing and its usage became restricted to refer only to an electric current, unlike its Spanish counterpart. Another example of a semantic narrowing is the Tagalog word ruweda (meaning "Ferris wheel"), a term derived from the Spanish word rueda which refers to any kind of wheel. Upon adoption into Tagalog, ruweda underwent usage specialization and its meaning became restricted to the Ferris wheel.

Semantic shift may also occur through semantic interference by another language, usually the English language. This phenomenon can result into reinterpretation of a Spanish-derived term by attributing to it an English meaning upon assimilation into Tagalog. An example is the Tagalog word libre, which is derived from the Spanish translation of the English word free, although used in Tagalog with the meaning of "without cost or payment" or "free of charge", a usage which would be deemed incorrect in Spanish as the term gratis would be more fitting; Tagalog word libre can also mean free in aspect of time, like "Libre ang oras" ("The time/hour is free", in the sense that the time is available). Another example is the Tagalog word iskiyerda, derived from the Spanish term izquierda meaning "left" as opposed to "right", although used in Tagalog with the meaning of "to leave".

Here is the list of Spanish-derived words which underwent semantic shift upon assimilation into Tagalog:

Tagalog words derived from pluralized Spanish nouns 

Some of the Spanish loanwords in Tagalog appear in their pluralized form, marked with -s or -es. However, in Tagalog, such words are not considered as plural and when they are pluralized in Tagalog, they need to be pluralized in the way that Tagalog pluralizes native words, i.e., by placing the pluralization marker mga before the word. For example, the word butones (meaning button used in clothing, from Sp. botones) is considered singular in Tagalog and its plural form is mga butones.

Tagalog words derived from Spanish verbs 

Several Spanish verbs are also adopted into Tagalog. Most of them are in their infinitive form characterized by the deletion of their final /r/, like for example in the case of the Tagalog intindi (to understand) derived from the Spanish verb entender. This feature is also found in Chavacano verbs which have a Spanish origin and it can be argued that an already restructured form of Spanish (Chavacano or a pidgin) was the origin of these Tagalog words. A list of these loanwords can be viewed below.

Alternatively, upon adoption into Tagalog, the final /r/ of the Spanish verbs in their infinitive form becomes /l/. Such is the case of the following loanwords: almusal (to have breakfast, from Sp. almorzar), dasal (from Sp. rezar), dupikal (from Sp. repicar), kasal (from Sp. casar), kumpisal (from Sp. confesar), minindal (from Sp. merendar), pasyal (from Sp. pasear) and sugal (from Sp. jugar). In some cases, the final /r/ remains unaltered in the Tagalog form like in the case of andar (to set in action or motion; from Sp. andar), asar (to annoy or to verbally irritate; from Sp. asar) and pundar (to establish or to save money for something; from Sp. fundar).

Conjugated Spanish verbs are also adopted into Tagalog. Examples include: pára (from Sp. parar), pása (from Sp. pasar), puwede (from Sp. poder), tíra (from Sp. tirar) and sige (from Sp. seguir). Imbiyerna (meaning to annoy or to irritate someone) is derived from the Spanish verb infernar (meaning to irritate or to provoke) and was allegedly coined by Ricardo "Rikki" Dalu, originally to describe the hellish feeling and the frustration he experienced when attending Spanish classes. In some cases, the conjugated verbs are combined with another word to form Tagalog morphemes like in the case of the following words: asikaso (from the combination of Sp. hacer and Sp. caso), balewala or baliwala (from the combination of Sp. valer and Tag. wala), etsapwera (from the combination of Sp. echar and Sp. fuera) and kumusta (from the combination of Sp. cómo and Sp. estar).

Spanish-Tagalog hybrid compound terms 

Some Tagalog compound terms are actually formed through a combination of a native Tagalog term and an etymologically Spanish term, like in the case of the idiomatic expression balat-sibuyas (a term referring to a person's easiness to be offended), which is a combination of the Tagalog balat and Spanish cebolla. The linguist Ekaterina Baklanova distinguishes at least two types of Spanish-Tagalog compound terms: hybrid loanwords or mixed-borrowings are partially translated Spanish terms which are adopted into Tagalog, e.g. karnerong-dagat (derived from the Spanish term carnero marino, meaning "seal") and anemonang-dagat (derived from the Spanish term anémona de mar, meaning "sea anemone"), while hybrid neologisms are new terms invented by Filipinos with use of some native and already assimilated Spanish-derived material, e.g. pader-ilog, meaning "embankment", derived from the combination of the Tagalog word ilog (meaning "river") and Spanish word pared (meaning "wall" and adopted in Tagalog as the word pader).

Below is the list of some Spanish-Tagalog hybrid compound terms. Because of the lack of standardization, some of the compound terms listed below are written differently (i.e. without the hyphen) in other Tagalog-based literature. For example, while the term sirang-plaka is usually encountered in many Tagalog-based works without the hyphen, there are also some instances of the term being written with the hyphen like in the case of one of the books written by the Chairman of the Commission on the Filipino Language Virgilio Almario, entitled Filipino ng mga Filipino: mga problema sa ispeling, retorika, at pagpapayaman ng wikang pambansa. Another example is the term takdang-oras, which can also be encountered in the literature without the hyphen. As a rule, a hybrid compound term below will be hyphenated if it has at least one instance of it being written with the hyphen in Tagalog-based literary works.

English 
English has been used in everyday Tagalog conversation. Code-switching between Tagalog and English is called Taglish. English words borrowed by Tagalog are mostly modern and technical terms, but some English words are also used for short usage (many Tagalog words translated from English are very long) or to avoid literal translation and repetition of the same particular Tagalog word. English makes the second largest foreign vocabulary of Tagalog after Spanish. In written language, English words in a Tagalog sentence are usually written as they are, but they are sometimes written in Tagalog phonetic spelling. Here are some examples:

Malay 
Many Malay loanwords entered the Tagalog vocabulary during pre-colonial times as Old Malay became the lingua franca of trade, commerce and diplomatic relations during the pre-colonial era of Philippine history as evidenced by the Laguna Copperplate Inscription of 900 AD and accounts of Antonio Pigafetta at the time of the Spanish arrival in the country five centuries later. Some Malay loanwords, such as bansa and guro (which in turn came from Sanskrit; see below), were later additions to the Tagalog language during the first half of the 20th century. Said words were proposals by the late linguist Eusebio T. Daluz to be adopted for further development of the Tagalog language and eventually found widespread usage among the lettered segment of the Tagalog-speaking population.

Sanskrit 

Jean Paul-Potet estimates that there are around 280 words in Tagalog that originated from Sanskrit. As in most Austronesian languages, the Sanskrit vocabulary incorporated into Tagalog were mostly borrowed indirectly via Malay or Javanese. While it was generally believed that Malay played a key role in the dissemination of the Indian lexical influences in Southeast Asia, there are also cases of words that are not attested in Old Malay but are present in Old Javanese, thus highlighting the possibility that the latter played a more important role in the dissemination of these words in Maritime Southeast Asia than was previously given credit for. Examples of such words that also reached the Philippines include anluwagi ("carpenter"; from Javanese uṇḍahagi meaning "woodworker" or "carpenter") and gusali ("building"; from Javanese gusali meaning "blacksmith"). As these words are more closely related to their Middle Indo-Aryan counterparts, they are not listed below.

Tamil 
Close contact through commercial networks between India and Maritime Southeast Asia for more than two millennia, bolstered by the establishment of Tamil as a literary language in India starting from the 9th century, allowed the spread of Dravidian loanwords in several local languages of Southeast Asia, including Old Malay and Tagalog. A list of Tagalog words with Tamil origins are shown below.

Arabic and Persian 

There are very few words in Tagalog that are identified as Arabic or Persian in origin, but some of them are very frequently use terms such as “salamat,” meaning “thank you.” According to Jean-Paul Potet, there are 60 Tagalog words that are identified with reasonable confidence as derived from Arabic or Persian, half of which are probably (roughly 23%) or unquestionably (roughly 26%) borrowed indirectly through Malay. The other half of the identified loanwords are directly derived from Arabic or Persian, like for example the word gumamela (the local Tagalog term for the Hibiscus flowers, derived from Arabic جميلة meaning beautiful). The table below shows different Arabic loanwords, including archaic and poetic ones, incorporated into the Tagalog lexicon. If an Arabic loanword is considered to be borrowed through the mediation of Malay, the intermediate Malay term is also specified.

Several Spanish loanwords incorporated into Tagalog have origins in the Arabic language. Examples include alahas (meaning jewel, from Sp. alhaja and ultimately from Arabic حاجة meaning "necessary or valuable thing"), albayalde (meaning white lead, from Sp. albayalde and ultimately from Arabic بياض meaning "white" or "whiteness"), alkansiya (meaning piggy bank, from Sp. alcancía and ultimately from Arabic كنز meaning "treasure"), alkatsopas (meaning artichoke, from Sp. alcachofa and ultimately from Arabic الخُرْشُوف), almires (meaning small mortar, from Sp. almirez and ultimately from Arabic مهراس), asapran (meaning saffron, from Sp. azafrán from Persian zarparan meaning "gold strung"), baryo (meaning village, from Sp. barrio and ultimately from Arabic بَرِّي), kapre (a Filipino mythological creature, from Sp. cafre and ultimately from Arabic كَافِر), kisame (meaning ceiling, from Sp. zaquizamí and ultimately from Arabic سقف في السماء meaning "ceiling in the sky"), etc. The table below does not include these numerous Hispano-Arabic terms as it will only focus on those loanwords which are directly borrowed from Arabic or Persian, or indirectly borrowed through Malay.

Hokkien 

Most Chinese loanwords in Tagalog were derived from Hokkien, the Southern Chinese language most widely spoken in the Philippines. Most of the 163 Hokkien-derived terms collected and analyzed by Gloria Chan-Yap are fairly recent and do not appear in the earliest Spanish dictionaries of Tagalog. Many loanwords such as pancit entered the Tagalog vocabulary during the Spanish colonial era when the Philippines experienced an increased influx of Chinese immigrants (mostly from the provinces of Fujian and Guangdong in Southern China) as Manila became an international entrepôt with the flourishing of the Manila-Acapulco Galleon Trade. Attractive economic opportunities boosted Chinese immigration to Spanish Manila and the new Chinese settlers brought with them their skills, culinary traditions and language, with the latter then influencing the native languages of the Philippines in the form of loanwords, most of which are related to cookery.

Japanese 
There are very few Tagalog words that are derived from Japanese. Many of them were introduced as recently as the twentieth century like tansan (bottle cap, from the Japanese 炭酸 which originally means refers to soda and carbonated drinks) and karaoke (from the Japanese カラオケ, literally means "empty orchestra") although there are very few Japanese words that appear in the earliest Spanish dictionaries of Tagalog such as katana (Japanese sword, from the Japanese かたな with the same meaning).

Some Filipino jokes are based on comical reinterpretation of Japanese terms as Tagalog words like for example in the case of otousan (from the Japanese お父さん meaning "father") which is reinterpreted as utusan (meaning "servant" or "maid") in Tagalog. As for the Tagalog word Japayuki, it refers to the Filipino migrants who flocked to Japan starting in the 1980s to work as entertainers and it is a portmanteau of the English word Japan and the Japanese word yuki (or 行き, meaning "going" or "bound to").

Nahuatl 

Tagalog gained Nahuatl words via Spanish from the Galleon trade with the Viceroyalty of Mexico during the Hispanic era.

Here are some examples:

Quechua 

Tagalog also absorbed Quechua vocabulary, from South America at the Viceroyalty of Peru, especially after Don Sebastián Hurtado de Corcuera former Governor of Panama, imported Peruvian soldiers and settlers to serve in the Philippines.

Cebuano 
Tagalog has loanwords from Cebuano, mostly due to Cebuano and Bisayan migration to Tagalog-speaking regions. Some of these terms refer to concepts that did not previously exist in Tagalog or relate to Cebuano or Bisaya culture; some others have pre-existing equivalents and are introduced to Tagalog by native Cebuano speakers. Some Tagalog slang are of Cebuano provenance (e.g. Tagalog jombag, from Cebuano sumbag).

Central Bicol

See also 

 Indian cultural influences in early Philippine polities
 Spanish language in the Philippines
 Philippine Spanish
 Philippine Hokkien

References 

Lists of loanwords
Tagalog words and phrases
Philippines-related lists